Tmesiphantes aridai is a species of tarantula in the family Theraphosidae, subfamily Theraphosinae. The type locality is Floresta Nacional do Tapajós, Santarém, in the state of Pará, Brazil.

Taxonomy 
The species was first described by Hector Gonzalez-Filho, Antonio Brescovit and Sylvia Lucas in 2014. The specific name aridai honors Filepe Arida, the grandson of one of the describers.

Description 
The male is distinguished from other species by an inconspicuous basal tegular projection on the palps and a tibial apophysis (i.e. a projection) with two similarly sized branches, and the retrolateral one is large and has an apical spine.

The female is identified by the spermathecae; these have inconspicuous constriction on the apex, also the shape of the apex is irregular. Urticating hairs are present in both genders.

References 

Theraphosidae
Spiders of Brazil
Spiders described in 2014